Bryant Pass is a mountain pass in Labrador, Canada.

Arctic Cordillera
Labrador
Landforms of Newfoundland and Labrador